Red Beach is a suburb surrounding the beach of the same name on the Hibiscus Coast, Auckland, New Zealand, at the base of the Whangaparaoa Peninsula. The suburb of Silverdale is to the south-west, and Orewa to the north. The beach is on the Hauraki Gulf and the suburb is bounded by two estuaries, that of the Weiti River to the south and the Orewa River to the north. The beach is named for the sand coloured by stamens from pōhutukawa trees.

The Hibiscus Coast Highway runs through the suburb. This was previously State Highway 1 and then State Highway 17. The majority of highway traffic now travels along the Northern Motorway inland instead, as the motorway was redesignated as State Highway 1 when an extension was completed in 2009. All road access to the rest of Whangaparaoa Peninsula  runs through the suburb.

The 44 hectare Peninsula Golf Course, established in 1956, was rezoned for residential development in 2013, despite local opposition and Fletcher Living gained resource consent to build 520 houses on the site in December 2014.

Demographics

Red Beach had a population of 8,346 at the 2018 New Zealand census, an increase of 795 people (10.5%) since the 2013 census, and an increase of 1,923 people (29.9%) since the 2006 census. There were 3,027 households, comprising 3,975 males and 4,374 females, giving a sex ratio of 0.91 males per female, with 1,548 people (18.5%) aged under 15 years, 1,368 (16.4%) aged 15 to 29, 3,531 (42.3%) aged 30 to 64, and 1,908 (22.9%) aged 65 or older.

Ethnicities were 88.9% European/Pākehā, 7.5% Māori, 2.5% Pacific peoples, 7.3% Asian, and 2.6% other ethnicities. People may identify with more than one ethnicity.

The percentage of people born overseas was 29.7, compared with 27.1% nationally.

Although some people chose not to answer the census's question about religious affiliation, 47.5% had no religion, 42.6% were Christian, 0.1% had Māori religious beliefs, 0.8% were Hindu, 0.3% were Muslim, 0.5% were Buddhist and 1.5% had other religions.

Of those at least 15 years old, 1,554 (22.9%) people had a bachelor's or higher degree, and 990 (14.6%) people had no formal qualifications. 1,488 people (21.9%) earned over $70,000 compared to 17.2% nationally. The employment status of those at least 15 was that 3,177 (46.7%) people were employed full-time, 1,095 (16.1%) were part-time, and 174 (2.6%) were unemployed.

Landmarks and attractions 

Popular attractions include:
The Red Beach Surf Club
Totara Views
William Bayes play ground
Red Beach Shops

Annual events 
Red Beach School Gala
Streetlight Competition

Education

Red Beach School is a contributing primary (years 1–6) school with a roll of  students. The school opened in 1989 covering years 1–8, but reduced its age range when Hibiscus Coast Intermediate opened in 1997 (the intermediate later became part of Whangaparaoa College).

KingsWay School is a state integrated composite (years 1–13) school with a roll of  students. The school provides a non-denominational Christian-based education.

Both schools are coeducational. Rolls are as of

Notes

External links
 Red Beach School website
 KingsWay School website
 Photographs of Red Beach held in Auckland Libraries' heritage collections.

Hibiscus and Bays Local Board Area
Populated places in the Auckland Region
Beaches of the Auckland Region
Hibiscus Coast